Del Sol or del Sol may refer to:

 Del Sol, Texas, a census-designated place in Texas
 Del Sol-Loma Linda, Texas, a former census-designated place in Texas
 Del Sol High School, a high school in Las Vegas, Nevada
 Del Sol High School (California), a high school in Oxnard, California
 Del Sol Press, a publishing company
 Del Sol metro station, a station in Santiago, Chile
 Luis del Sol, former Spanish footballer
 Honda CR-X del Sol, a two-seat, targa top convertible manufactured by Honda in the 1990s
 Del Sol Quartet, a San Francisco-based string quartet